Raelene Elaine Villania(born June 29, 1986), known professionally as Iya Villania-Arellano, is a Filipino-Australian singer, television presenter, and actress. She has been widely known for her work as a VJ in the music channel MYX.

Early and personal life
Raelene Elaine Ebaler Villania was born and raised in Sydney to Filipino parents, Ray Villania and Elena Nada Ebaler. The youngest of three siblings, she has two older sisters named Rhoda and Sheila. Villania's interest in music started when her father sang karaoke when she was a child.  She used to be a member of a touring band in Australia called Iron & Clay that address issues in schools and churches such bullying, drunk driving, and self-esteem. Later, she returned to the Philippines and attended high school at Colegio San Agustin in Makati, graduating in March 2004. She attended college at De La Salle University – Manila majoring in psychology and graduated on December 16, 2008.

On January 31, 2014, Villania married Drew Arellano, her boyfriend and a television host. Their wedding was held in Nasugbu, Batangas. They have four children with him: Antonio Primo (born 2016), Alonzo Leon (born 2018), Alana Lauren (born 2020), and Astro Phoenix (born 2022).

Villania is an advocate for abstaining from sex before marriage. She divulged that she had not had sexual intercourse before marrying Arellano, who himself was supportive of her decision. Although she does not necessarily condemn women who has had intercourse, she remarked that virginity is "something that a girl can be proud of". She was raised in the Seventh-day Adventist faith, but has since been excommunicated. In January 2022, Villania, alongside Arellano and their three children, tested positive for COVID-19.

Career
Villania's first television appearance in the Philippines was in 2003 on the IBC interactive program "Game Channel". After she gained a "cult" following, the management team of GMA Network took notice and cast her in the daytime drama Walang Hanggan. She then played the role of Sydney Torres in the third and fourth seasons of the iconic teen series Click.

In 2004, she moved to GMA's rival network ABS-CBN and was announced as one of the new VJ's for their subsidiary music channel Myx. She would remain in the job for 10 years. Subsequently, she was regularly featured in the variety show ASAP. Villania's feature film debut was in the 2004 drama "A Beautiful Life" alongside acclaimed actresses Gloria Romero, Dina Bonnevie and Amy Austria. In the same year, Villania appeared in the critically acclaimed historical film Aishite Imasu 1941: Mahal Kita. Her run as host on ABS-CBN included briefly co-hosting the noontime game show Wowowee in 2005, the two seasons of the reality dance competition show U Can Dance in 2006 and 2007, the reality show I Dare You in 2011 and her two-year stint on ABS-CBN's morning show Umagang Kay Ganda. Villania also hosted the Studio 23 lifestyle program Us Girls from 2006 to 2012. In 2008, she released her first album, Finally! under Viva Records.

After signing an executive contract with GMA Network in October 2014, Villania made a part of Sunday All Stars (2013–2015), a variety show. She became the Chika Minute segment anchor of 24 Oras In June 15, 2015. replacing Pia Guanio.

Popular culture
She accidentally popularized a now very common Filipino slang greeting "haller/heller" in place of "hello". This was credited to her distinctive and then-unfamiliar Australian twang in her early showbiz career years. On her show, Game Channel - Filipino viewers misheard her intro greeting as though she's saying "Heller!".

Discography

 Finally! (2008)

Filmography

Television

Films

Notes

References

External links
 

1986 births
Living people
Filipino film actresses
Filipino television actresses
Filipino female models
Participants in Philippine reality television series
Australian emigrants to the Philippines
Australian people of Filipino descent
Actresses from Sydney
People from Metro Manila
Australian female models
Models from Sydney
VJs (media personalities)
Filipino television variety show hosts
GMA Network personalities
GMA Integrated News and Public Affairs people
ABS-CBN personalities
Star Magic
De La Salle University alumni
Viva Records (Philippines) artists
21st-century Filipino singers
21st-century Filipino women singers
Former Seventh-day Adventists